Margaret Flora Spittle OBE FRCP FRCR (born 10 November 1939) is a British oncologist.

References

1939 births
Living people
Fellows of the Royal College of Physicians
Officers of the Order of the British Empire